Córdoba railway station, also known as Córdoba Central is the main railway station of the Spanish city of Córdoba, Andalusia. It was opened in 1994 replacing an older station.

Services
Córdoba is an important junction in the Spanish rail network, serving three AVE high-speed rail lines, connecting Madrid Atocha with Málaga, Seville and Granada; and conventional Iberian gauge lines hosting various Media and Larga Distancia services. Trains passing through Córdoba also connect to Cádiz, Barcelona Sants and Jaén.

References

External links

  

Buildings and structures in Córdoba, Spain
Railway stations in Andalusia
Railway stations in Spain opened in 1994